The Taxila copper-plate, also called the Moga inscription or the Patika copper-plate is a notable archaeological artifact found in the area of Taxila, Gandhara, in modern Pakistan. It is now in the collection of the British Museum.

Description
The copper plate is dated to a period between the 1st century BCE and the 1st century CE. It bears an imprecise date: the 5th day of the Macedonian month of Panemos, in the year 78 of king Moga. It is thought it may be related to the establishment of a Maues era, which would give a date around 6 CE.

The copper plate is written in the Kharosthi script (a script derived from Aramaic). It relates the dedication of a relic of the Buddha Shakyamuni (Pali: śakamuni, literally "Master of the Shakas") to a Buddhist monastery by the Indo-Scythian (Pali: "śaka") ruler Patika Kusulaka, son of Liaka Kusulaka, satrap of Chukhsa, near Taxila.

The inscription is significant in that it documents the fact that Indo-Scythians practiced the Buddhist faith. It is also famous for mentioning Patika Kusulaka, who also appears as a "Great Satrap" in the Mathura lion capital inscription.

Text of the inscription

Notes

References
British Museum display (Asian gallery)
W. W.Tarn, The Greeks in Bactria and India, Munshiram Manoharlal Publishers Pvt. Ltd. 1980 (reprinted from the 1951 edition).
Stefan Baums. 2012. “Catalog and Revised Texts and Translations of Gandharan Reliquary Inscriptions.” In: David Jongeward, Elizabeth Errington, Richard Salomon and Stefan Baums, Gandharan Buddhist Reliquaries, pp. 211–212, Seattle: Early Buddhist Manuscripts Project (Gandharan Studies, Volume 1).
Stefan Baums and Andrew Glass. 2002– . Catalog of Gāndhārī Texts, no. CKI 46

Indian inscriptions
Linguistic history of India
Archaeological artifacts
Taxila Tehsil